Jonathan Fumeaux (born 7 March 1988) is a Swiss former racing cyclist. He rode in the 2014 Vuelta a España.

Major results

2011
 1st Stage 3 Grand Prix Chantal Biya
 7th Overall Le Triptyque des Monts et Châteaux
 9th Grand Prix de Plumelec-Morbihan
2012
 1st Stage 6 Tour Alsace
 1st  Mountains classification Le Triptyque des Monts et Châteaux
 5th Overall Tour de Bretagne
 8th Overall An Post Rás
2013
 8th Overall Tour de Luxembourg
 8th GP du canton d'Argovie
 8th Tour du Jura
2016
 National Road Championships
1st  Road race
4th Time trial

References

External links
 

1988 births
Living people
Swiss male cyclists
People from Sion, Switzerland
Sportspeople from Valais